KBHM (88.3 FM) was a radio station formerly licensed to Kimball, Nebraska, United States. The station was owned by Cedar Cove Broadcasting, Inc.

History
The station went on the air as KEZF on 2008-05-23. On 2009-02-16, the station changed its call sign to KGCQ, on 2010-11-15 to KVAM, and on 2015-06-12 to KBHM.

Owner Cedar Cove Broadcasting surrendered KBHM's license to the Federal Communications Commission (FCC) on June 25, 2015. The FCC cancelled it the following day.

References

External links

BHM
Radio stations established in 2008
Defunct radio stations in the United States
Radio stations disestablished in 2015
2008 establishments in Nebraska
2015 disestablishments in Nebraska
Defunct mass media in Nebraska
Kimball County, Nebraska